The 159th Pennsylvania House of Representatives District is located in Delaware
County. The 159th District lies in the Southeast part of the state. It has been represented by Carol Kazeem since 2022.

District profile
Delaware County, where the 159th district is located, is the fifth most populated county in the state. Chester of the 159th district is the oldest city in the state, being incorporated in 1682. The district includes the following areas:
 Chester
 Chester Township
 Eddystone
 Lower Chichester Township
 Marcus Hook
 Parkside
 Ridley Township (PART)
 Ward 01 [PART, Division 01]
 Ward 02 [PART, Division 02] 
 Trainer
 Upland
 Upper Chichester Township (PART)
 Ward 01 [PART, Division 02]
 Ward 02 [PART, Division 02]
 Ward 03 [PART, Division 02]

Representatives

Recent election results

References

External links
District Map from the United States Census Bureau
Pennsylvania House Legislative District Maps from the Pennsylvania Redistricting Commission.  
Population Data for District 159 from the Pennsylvania Redistricting Commission.

Government of Delaware County, Pennsylvania
159